Peter Bramley (1785 – 5 November 1838) was an English professional cricketer who played first-class cricket in 1826, having played for Nottingham Cricket Club since 1813.  He was primarily a batsman who fielded at cover point.

He was a publican by trade and kept the Old Spot Inn at Daybrook in Nottinghamshire.  A keen cards player, he had a reputation for gambling but was said to be "fundamentally kind at heart".

The only first-class match that Bramley took part in was Sheffield and Leicester v Nottingham at Sheffield's Darnall New Ground in July 1826.  Tom Marsden scored 227 for Sheffield and Leicester, who won by an innings and 203.

Bramley was born at Arnold, Nottinghamshire and died at the Graziers Half Way House in Nottinghamshire.

References

1785 births
1838 deaths
English cricketers
English cricketers of 1826 to 1863
Nottingham Cricket Club cricketers
People from Arnold, Nottinghamshire
Cricketers from Nottinghamshire
British publicans
19th-century British businesspeople